The 1904 Albion football team, sometimes known as the Albion Methodists, was an American football team that represented Albion College in the Michigan Intercollegiate Athletic Association (MIAA) during the 1904 college football season. In its first season under head coach Walter S. Kennedy, Albion compiled a 7–0–1 record, held every opponent scoreless, outscored opponents by a total of 206 to 0, and won the MIAA championship. The team's victories included games against two future Division I FBS programs, a 4–0 victory over otherwise undefeated Michigan Agricultural (now Michigan State University) and a 68–0 victory over Michigan State Normal (now Eastern Michigan University).

The team played its home games at Winter–Lau Field in Albion, Michigan; the field was built in 1900 with funds donated by John Winter and Oliver Lau.

Schedule

References

Albion
Albion Britons football seasons
College football undefeated seasons
Albion football